Cumberland Infirmary is a hospital in Carlisle, Cumbria, England. It is managed by the North Cumbria Integrated Care NHS Foundation Trust.

History

The original Cumberland Infirmary is a Grade II* listed building which was designed by Richard Tattersall and constructed by Messrs Robinson and Bennet, contractors of Preston, between 1830 and 1832. A new wing was opened by the Countess of Lonsdale in October 1911. The founder of the Roper-Logan-Tierney nursing process, Nancy Roper, worked as senior nurse tutor at the hospital in the 1950s. A further extension was opened by Princess Anne in 1975.

The present Cumberland Infirmary was procured under a Private Finance Initiative contract in 1997, the first hospital to be bond financed. Health Management (Carlisle) plc, a 50/50 dedicated joint venture company formed by AMEC and Interserve (Facilities Management) Ltd was given a 45-year concession period. The hospital, which was built by AMEC, cost £65m to construct.

The new hospital consolidating the operations of three previous hospitals, namely the previous Cumberland Infirmary, the Carlisle City General Hospital and the Carlisle City Maternity Hospital. The hospital was officially opened by British Prime Minister Tony Blair, on 16 June 2000.

In 2015 a  report commissioned by North Cumbria University Hospitals NHS Trust found that the fire proofing materials installed did not meet the required protection standard to allow for safe evacuation and prevent a fire from spreading across the building.  It was described by the secretary of Cumbria’s Fire Brigades Union as  "one of Carlisle’s biggest fire risks". The Trust said that this was not the first time they had uncovered major flaws in the PFI scheme.

In 2021, a new cancer centre was opened on the site, with services transitioning to Newcastle upon Tyne Hospitals NHS Foundation Trust.

Incidents 
On 2 June 2010, the hospital's Accident and Emergency department was put on full incident standby in the aftermath of the Cumbria shootings.

See also
 Grade II* listed buildings in the City of Carlisle
 Listed buildings in Carlisle, Cumbria
 Healthcare in Cumbria
 List of hospitals in England

References

External links 

 
 Cumberland Infirmary on the NHS website
 Inspection reports from the Care Quality Commission

1832 establishments in England
Hospitals established in 1832
Hospital buildings completed in 2000
Hospitals in Cumbria
Buildings and structures in Carlisle, Cumbria